Nipsey is a nickname. Notable people with the nickname include:

Nipsey Hussle (1985–2019), American rapper
Nipsey Russell (1918–2005), American actor, comedian, poet, and dancer

See also
Nipsy, or knurr and spell, English game
Nispey, village in Iran